The Worshipful Company of International Bankers is one of the livery companies of the City of London. Its members are current or former members of the financial services industry, primarily banking. It is based in a building in Austin Friars, near Liverpool Street station.

In 1999 the City of London Corporation extended the possibility of freedom of the City of London beyond UK, Commonwealth and European Union citizens. This led to the possibility of a company with "international" membership. The Guild of International Bankers was founded in July 2001 and in October 2002 it became a company without livery. On 21 September 2004 its petition for livery status was granted by the Court of Aldermen. A Royal Charter was granted on 10 December 2007.

The Company ranks 106th in the order of precedence for the City livery companies. Its motto, A Natione ad Nationem, translates from Latin as "From Nation to Nation", reflecting its international character. The arms of the Company are blazoned: Per pale Sable and Gules a Dragon rampant Argent within an Orle of ten Bezants.

The Company is affiliated with several others, including HMS Belfast Sea Cadets & 16F (Wood Green & Hornsey) Squadron of the Air Training Corps.

The Company is a member of the Financial Services Group of Livery Companies, the other 11 members of which are the Worshipful Companies of Chartered Accountants, Actuaries, Arbitrators, Chartered Secretaries and Administrators, Insurers, Information Technologists, City of London Solicitors, Management Consultants, Marketors, Tax Advisers, and World Traders.

The Company's Church is St Mary-le-Bow

External links
International Bankers' Company website

References 

International Bankers
2001 establishments in England
International banking institutions
Banking in the United Kingdom
Bankers associations